James Anderson defeated Bob Schlesinger 6–3, 6–4, 3–6, 5–7, 6–3 in the final to win the men's singles tennis title at the 1924 Australasian Championships.

Seeds
The seeded players are listed below. James Anderson is the champion; others show the round in which they were eliminated.

 James Anderson (champion)
 Gerald Patterson (second round)
 Pat O'Hara Wood (third round)
 Bob Schlesinger (finalist)
 Ronald Thomas (third round)
 Gar Hone (semifinals)
 Jim Willard (third round)
 Rupert Wertheim (quarterfinals)

Draw

Key
 Q = Qualifier
 WC = Wild card
 LL = Lucky loser
 r = Retired

Earlier rounds

Section 1

Section 2

Section 3

Section 4

See also
1924 Australasian Championships – Women's singles

References
 
  Source for seedings

Australian Championships – Men's singles
Men's Singles